North Township may refer to the following places in Indiana:

North Township, Lake County, Indiana
North Township, Marshall County, Indiana

See also
North Township (disambiguation)

Indiana township disambiguation pages